The Office of the Special Envoy to Monitor and Combat Antisemitism (formerly the Office to Monitor and Combat Anti-Semitism) is an office of the Under Secretary for Civilian Security, Democracy, and Human Rights at the United States Department of State. The office "advances U.S. foreign policy on antisemitism" by developing and implementing policies and projects to support efforts to combat antisemitism.

The head of the office is the Special Envoy for Monitoring  and  Combating Antisemitism (SEAS), who reports to the U.S. Secretary of State. In 2021, the special envoy was elevated to an ambassador-at-large nominated by the U.S. president and confirmed by the U.S. Senate. The position was previously appointed by the secretary of state.

Responsibilities
The office's responsibilities under U.S. federal law are:

 monitoring and combating acts of anti-Semitism and anti-Semitic incitement that occur in foreign countries;
 providing input on antisemitism for two annual reports issued by the State Department:
Country Reports on Human Rights Practices
Annual Report on International Religious Freedom
 consult[ing] with domestic and international nongovernmental organizations and multilateral organizations and institutions, as the Special Envoy considers appropriate

History

Bush administration
The Office was created by the Global Anti-Semitism Review Act of 2004, reporting to the Assistant Secretary of State for Democracy, Human Rights, and Labor (DRL). The first Special Envoy was Gregg Rickman, a Congressional staffer who had served as Director of Congressional Affairs for the Republican Jewish Coalition. Rickman was sworn in on May 22, 2006 and served until the end of the George W. Bush administration.

Obama administration
Hannah Rosenthal served in the post under the Obama administration from November 23, 2009 to October 5, 2012. Rosenthal was praised for formalizing the office's work and criteria, and for her personal involvement against anti-Semitic acts globally; however, she also received criticism from her predecessor Rickman and from Abraham Foxman of the Anti-Defamation League, for including Muslim community leaders in joint activities against religious hatred.

Rosenthal was succeeded on an interim basis by career diplomat and former U.S. ambassador to Belarus Michael Kozak.

Kozak served in the role until Ira Forman, the former executive director of the National Jewish Democratic Council, was sworn in as Special Envoy on May 20, 2013; he served until Obama's term in office ended in January 2017.

Trump administration
In June 2017, five months into the Trump administration, Secretary of State Rex Tillerson cast doubt on whether the post of Special Envoy would be filled during Trump's presidency. Members of the House and Senate publicly expressed concern that the position was unfilled and called for Trump to make an appointment, at the same time calling on Trump to fill the vacant position of White House Jewish Liaison. Congressional concern over the vacancy continued to grow throughout 2018 and early 2019. On February 5, 2019, Secretary of State Mike Pompeo announced the appointment of Elan Carr, a Los Angeles County deputy district attorney who had served as an active duty officer in the United States Army Judge Advocate General's Corps.

Biden administration
In 2021, the Special Envoy was elevated to an Ambassador-at-Large nominated by the U.S. President and confirmed by the U.S. Senate.

On July 30, 2021, President Joe Biden nominated scholar Deborah Lipstadt for this role. Opposition from Senator Ron Johnson, whom she had tweeted was advocating "white supremacy/nationalism", delayed her nomination for many months. Her initial nomination expired at the end of the year.

After renomination, the Senate Foreign Relations Committee held hearings on her nomination on February 8, 2022. On March 29, 2022, the committee favorably reported her nomination out of committee. Her nomination was supported by all committee Democrats, as well as senators Mitt Romney and Marco Rubio. Her nomination was confirmed by voice vote on March 30, 2022, and she was sworn in on May 3, 2022.

List of special envoys

See also
 White House Jewish Liaison

References

External links
Office to Monitor and Combat Anti-Semitism 
US Code, Title 22, Chapter 38, § 2731. Monitoring and combating anti-Semitism, from Legal Information Institute at Cornell University Law School.

Opposition to antisemitism in the United States
United States Department of State agencies
2004 establishments in the United States